Chinese star names (Chinese: , xīng míng) are named according to ancient Chinese astronomy and astrology. The sky is divided into star mansions (xīng xiù, also translated as "lodges") and asterisms (xīng guān). The system of 283 asterisms under Three Enclosures and Twenty-eight Mansions was established by Chen Zhuo of the Three Kingdoms period, who synthesized ancient constellations and the asterisms created by early astronomers Shi Shen, Gan De and Wuxian. Since the Han and Jin Dynasties, stars have been given reference numbers within their asterisms in a system similar to the Bayer or Flamsteed designations, so that individual stars can be identified.

In the Qing Dynasty, Chinese knowledge of the sky was improved by the arrival of European star charts. Yixiang Kaocheng, compiled in mid-18th century by then deputy Minister of Rites Ignaz Kögler, expanded the star catalogue to more than 3000 stars. Some stars may have been assigned more than one name due to the inaccuracies of traditional star charts.

While there is little disagreement on the correspondence between traditional Chinese and Western star names for brighter stars, many asterisms, in particular those originally from Gan De, were created primarily for astrological purposes and can only be mapped to very dim stars. The first attempt to fully map the Chinese constellations was made by Paul Tsuchihashi in late 19th century.  In 1981, based on Yixiang Kaocheng and Yixiang Kaocheng Xubian, the first complete map of Chinese stars and constellations was published by Yi Shitong (伊世同).

The list is based on Atlas Comparing Chinese and Western Star Maps and Catalogues by Yi Shitong (1981) and Star Charts in Ancient China by Chen Meidong (1996). In a few cases, meanings of the names are vague due to their antiquity. In this article, the translation by Hong Kong Space Museum is used.

Three Enclosures

Purple Forbidden Enclosure
The Purple Forbidden Enclosure ( Zǐ Wēi Yuán) occupies the region around the north celestial pole and represents the imperial palace. It corresponds to constellations Auriga, Boötes, Camelopardalis, Canes Venatici, Cassiopeia, Cepheus, Draco, Hercules, Leo Minor, Lynx, Ursa Major, and Ursa Minor.

Added Stars

Supreme Palace Enclosure
The Supreme Palace Enclosure (Tài Wēi Yuán) represents the imperial court. It corresponds to constellations Canes Venatici, Coma Berenices, Leo, Leo Minor, Lynx, Sextans, Ursa Major and Virgo.

Added Stars

Heavenly Market Enclosure
The Heavenly Market Enclosure (Tiān Shì Yuán) represents the emperor's realm. It corresponds to constellations Aquila, Boötes, Corona Borealis, Draco, Hercules, Ophiuchus, Sagitta, Serpens and Vulpecula.

Added Stars

Azure Dragon

Horn
The Horn mansion represents the Dragon's horns. It corresponds to constellations Centaurus, Circinus, Coma Berenices, Hydra, Lupus and Virgo.

Added Stars

Neck
The Neck mansion represents the Dragon's neck. It corresponds to constellations Boötes, Centaurus, Hydra, Libra, Lupus and Virgo.

Added Stars

Root
The Root mansion represents the Dragon's chest. It corresponds to constellations Boötes, Centaurus, Hydra, Libra, Lupus, Serpens and Virgo.

Added Stars

Room
The Room mansion represents the Dragon's abdomen. It corresponds to constellations Libra, Lupus, Ophiuchus and Scorpius.

Added Stars

Heart
The Heart mansion represents the Dragon's heart. It corresponds to constellations Lupus, Ophiuchus and Scorpius.

Added Stars

Tail
The Tail mansion represents the Dragon's tail. It corresponds to constellations Ara, Ophiuchus and Scorpius.

Added Stars

Winnowing Basket
The Winnowing Basket mansion is the last of the Azure Dragon mansions. It corresponds to constellations Ara, Ophiuchus and Sagittarius.

Added Stars

Black Turtle

Dipper
The Dipper mansion is the first of the Black Turtle mansions. It corresponds to constellations Aquila, Corona Australis, Ophiuchus, Sagittarius, Scutum and Telescopium.

Added Stars

Ox
The Ox mansion corresponds to constellations Aquila, Capricornus, Cygnus, Delphinus, Lyra, Microscopium, Sagitta, Sagittarius and Vulpecula. Its name derives from the Cowherd Star.

Added Stars

Girl
The Girl mansion corresponds to constellations Aquarius, Aquila, Capricornus, Cygnus, Draco and Delphinus.

Added Stars

Ruins
The Ruins mansion (also translated as Emptiness) corresponds to constellations Aquarius, Capricornus, Delphinus, Equuleus, Grus, Microscopium, Pegasus and Piscis Austrinus.

Added Stars

Rooftop
The Rooftop mansion corresponds to constellations Andromeda, Aquarius, Cepheus, Cygnus, Draco, Lacerta, Pegasus, Piscis Austrinus and Vulpecula.

Added Stars

Encampment
The Encampment mansion corresponds to constellations Andromeda, Aquarius, Capricornus, Cassiopeia, Cepheus, Cygnus, Lacerta, Pegasus, Pisces and Piscis Austrinus.

Added Stars

Wall
The Wall mansion corresponds to constellations Andromeda, Cetus, Pegasus and Pisces.

Added Stars

White Tiger

Legs
The Legs mansion represents the tail of White Tiger. It corresponds to constellations Andromeda, Cassiopeia, Cetus, Pisces and Triangulum.

Added Stars

Bond
The Bond mansion represents the body of White Tiger. It corresponds to constellations Andromeda, Aries, Cetus, Fornax, Perseus, Pisces and Triangulum.

Added Stars

Stomach
The Stomach mansion represents the body of White Tiger. It corresponds to constellations Aries, Camelopardalis, Cetus, Eridanus, Perseus, Taurus and Triangulum.

Added Stars

Hairy Head
The Hairy Head mansion represents the body of White Tiger. It corresponds to constellations Aries, Cetus, Eridanus, Fornax, Perseus and Taurus.

Added Stars

Net
The Net mansion represents the body of White Tiger. It corresponds to constellations Auriga, Eridanus, Horologium, Lepus, Orion, Perseus and Taurus.

Added Stars

Turtle Beak
The Turtle Beak mansion represents the head of White Tiger. It corresponds to constellations Auriga, Gemini, Lynx, Orion and Taurus.

Added Stars

Three Stars
The Three Stars mansion represents the body of White Tiger. It corresponds to constellations Columba, Eridanus, Lepus, Monoceros and Orion. 

Added Stars

Vermilion Bird
The final seven mansions represents the Vermilion Bird, creature of the direction south and the element fire.

Well
The Well Mansion corresponds to constellations Auriga, Cancer, Canis Major, Canis Minor, Carina, Columba, Gemini, Monoceros, Orion, Pictor, Puppis and Taurus.

Added Stars

Ghosts
The Ghosts Mansion corresponds to constellations Cancer, Gemini, Hydra, Monoceros, Puppis, Pyxis and Vela.

Added Stars

Willow
The Willow Mansion corresponds to constellations Cancer, Hydra and Leo.

Added Stars

Star
The Star Mansion corresponds to constellations Cancer, Hydra, Leo, Leo Minor, Lynx, Sextans.

Added Stars

Extended Net
The Extended Net Mansion corresponds to constellation Hydra.

Added Stars

Wings
The Wings Mansion corresponds to constellations Crater and Hydra.

Added Stars

Chariot
The Chariot Mansion corresponds to constellations Corvus, Crater, Hydra and Virgo.

Added Stars

Individual Stars with Traditional Names
Names listed above are all enumerations within the respective Chinese constellations. The following stars have traditional proper names.

Single Star Asterisms

Proper Names of Individual Stars

Notes

References

 
Chinese star names, traditional